Weida is a town in the district of Greiz, in Thuringia, Germany, situated 12 km south of Gera on the river Weida.

History
Within the German Empire (1871-1918), Weida was part of the Grand Duchy of Saxe-Weimar-Eisenach.

The Eisenhammer Weida is an historic hammer mill.

References

External links
 Landkreis Greiz 

Greiz (district)
Grand Duchy of Saxe-Weimar-Eisenach